Prince Miguel Januário of Braganza (full name Miguel Maria Carlos Egídio Constantino Gabriel Rafael Gonzaga Francisco de Paula e de Assis Januário de Bragança; 19 September 1853 – 11 October 1927) was the Miguelist claimant to the throne of Portugal from 1866 to 1920. He used the title Duke of Braganza.

Early life

Miguel Januário was born in Castle Kleinheubach, near Miltenberg, Kingdom of Bavaria, on 19 September 1853 during the exile in Germany of his father, former King Miguel I of Portugal and the Algarves. His mother was Princess Adelaide of Löwenstein-Wertheim-Rosenberg. He was a grandson of King John VI of Portugal, Brazil and the Algarves and his wife, Queen Carlota Joaquina.

By the Portuguese law of banishment of 1834 and the constitution of 1838, King Miguel was forbidden to enter Portugal. Therefore, he was educated in the German Confederation and in Austria-Hungary.

Career
He was a member of the staff of Emperor Franz Joseph I of Austria and took part in the Austro-Hungarian campaign in Bosnia and Herzegovina in 1878.  His second son, Prince Francisco José of Braganza, was named after the Austrian Emperor, who was his godfather.

Miguel Januário held the rank of a colonel in the 7th Austrian Regiment of Hussars. During World War I, he held the rank of Lieutenant General (Feldmarschalleutnant) in the Austro-Hungarian Army. He resigned in 1917 when Portugal entered the conflict on the opposite side, and spent the rest of the war as a civilian in the Order of Malta. After the end of Austria-Hungary, Miguel Januário and his family were thrown into relative poverty.

On 31 July 1920, after quarrels with his eldest son (who contracted a controversial marriage to an American heiress), Miguel Januário renounced his claims as King of Portugal in favour of his third son, Duarte Nuno, who was 13 years old at the time.

Marriages and children
Miguel Januário was first married to Princess Elisabeth of Thurn and Taxis (May 28, 1860 – February 7, 1881), the niece of Empress Elisabeth of Austria, on 17 October, 1877 in Regensburg. They had three children:

 Dom Miguel, Duke of Viseu (1878–1923), married Anita Stewart and had issue.
 Dom Francisco José de Bragança (1879–1919), died unmarried and without issue.
 Dona Maria Teresa de Bragança (1881–1945), married Prince Karl Ludwig of Thurn und Taxis and had issue.

After the death of his first wife, he married for a second time to his first cousin Princess Maria Theresa of Löwenstein-Wertheim-Rosenberg (1870–1935), on 8 November 1893 at Kleinheubach. They had eight children:

 Dona Isabel Maria de Bragança (1894–1970), married Franz Joseph, 9th Prince of Thurn and Taxis and had issue.
 Dona Maria Benedita de Bragança (1896–1971), died unmarried and without issue.
 Dona Mafalda de Bragança (1898–1918), died unmarried and without issue. 
 Dona Maria Ana de Bragança (1899–1971), married the future Karl August, 10th Prince of Thurn and Taxis and had issue.
 Dona Maria Antónia de Bragança (1903–1973), married Sidney Ashley Chanler (son of William Astor Chanler) and had issue.
 Dona Filipa de Bragança (1905–1990), died unmarried and without issue.
 Dom Duarte Nuno, Duke of Braganza (1907–1976), married Princess Maria Francisca de Orléans e Bragança and had issue.
 Dona Maria Adelaide de Bragança (1912–2012), married Nicolaas van Uden and had issue.

Miguel Januário died in Seebenstein, on October 11, 1927.  He is buried at Kloster Maria Himmelfahrt in Bronnbach.

Honours
 : Grand Master of the Order of St. Michael of the Wing
 : Knight of the Golden Fleece, 1881
 : Knight of St. Hubert, 1900

In film
In the 1968 film Mayerling, "Michel de Bragance" is a small character played by Jean-Claude Bercq.

See also
Descendants of Miguel I of Portugal

References

Ancestry

External links
 

|-

Portuguese royalty
Knights of the Golden Fleece of Austria
Dukes of Braganza
House of Braganza
1853 births
1927 deaths
Pretenders to the Portuguese throne
People from Kleinheubach
19th-century Portuguese people
Child pretenders
Sons of kings